Eucithara celebensis is a small sea snail, a marine gastropod mollusk in the family Mangeliidae.

Distribution
This marine species is found off the Philippines and Queensland, Australia.

Description
The length of the shell varies between 6 mm and 15 mm.

The shell is smooth. It is plicately ribbed with the ribs rather distant. Its color is light yellowish and brown banded.

References

 Hinds, R.B. 1843. Description of new shells from the collection of Captain Belcher. Annals and Magazine of Natural History ser. 1 11: 16-21, 36-46, 255-257
 Brazier, J. 1876. A list of the Pleurotomidae collected during the Chevert Expedition, with the description of the new species. Proceedings of the Linnean Society of New South Wales 1: 151-162
 Melvill, J.C. & Standen, R. 1896. Notes on a collection of shells from Lifu and Uvea, Loyalty Islands, formed by the Rev. James and Mrs. Hadfield, with list of species. Part II. Journal of Conchology 8(9): 273-315, pls 9-11
 Hervier, J. 1897. Descriptions d'espèces nouvelles de Mollusques provenant de l'Archipel de la Nouvelle Calédonie. Journal de Conchyliologie 45: 47-69, pls 2-3
 Sowerby, G.B III. 1907. Descriptions of new Marine Mollusca from New Caledonia, etc. Proceedings of the Malacological Society of London 7(5): 299-303

External links
  Tucker, J.K. 2004 Catalog of recent and fossil turrids (Mollusca: Gastropoda). Zootaxa 682:1-1295
 
 Chen-Kwoh Chang, Small Turrids of Taiwan, Hawaiian Shell News, June 1 2001

celebensis
Gastropods described in 1846